This article lists the squads for the 2022 Women's Africa Cup of Nations, the 14th edition of the Women's Africa Cup of Nations, a biennial women's international football tournament for national teams in Africa, organised by the Confederation of African Football and held in Morocco from 2 to 23 July 2022. Due to the impact of the COVID-19 pandemic in Africa, each national team registered a squad of 26 players.

The age listed for each player is on 2 July 2022, the first day of the tournament. The numbers of caps and goals listed for each player do not include any matches played after the start of tournament. The club listed is the club for which the player last played a competitive match prior to the tournament. The nationality for each club reflects the national association (not the league) to which the club is affiliated. A flag is included for coaches that are of a different nationality than their own national team.

Group A

Burkina Faso
The squad was announced on 27 June 2022. Djamila Derra withdrew from the squad and was replaced by Chantal Zongo.

Head coach: Pascal Sawadogo

Morocco
The squad was announced on 1 July 2022.

Head coach:  Reynald Pedros

Senegal
The squad was announced on 24 June 2022.

Head coach: Mame Moussa Cissé

Uganda
The squad was announced on 21 June 2022.

Head coach: George Lutalo

Group B

Cameroon
The squad was announced on 20 June 2022.

Head coach: Gabriel Zabo

Togo
The squad was announced on 23 June 2022.

Head coach: Kaï Tomety

Tunisia
The squad was announced on 22 June 2022. Neila Chemkhi, Eya Bellaaj, and Meriem Sassi were named in the squad list sent to CAF, but did not travel with the squad due to the Tunisian Football Federation being unwilling to pay for the extra players.

Head coach: Samir Landolsi

Zambia
The squad was announced on 10 June 2022. Barbra Banda withdrew from the squad due to medical reasons, which was rumoured to be high levels of testosterone.

Head coach: Bruce Mwape

Group C

Botswana
The squad was announced on 18 June 2022.

Head coach: Gaoletlhoo Nkutlwisang

Burundi
The squad was announced on 23 June 2022.

Head coach: Gustave Niyonkuru

Nigeria
The squad was announced on 25 June 2022. Chidinma Okeke withdrew from the squad due to injury.

Head coach:  Randy Waldrum

South Africa
A preliminary squad was announced on 1 June 2022. The squad was announced on 20 June 2022. Kebotseng Moletsane, Tiisetso Makhubela, and Thubelihle Shamase were on standby, but included in the final squad.

Head coach: Desiree Ellis

Player representation

By club
Clubs with 6 or more players represented are listed.

By club nationality

By club federation

By representatives of domestic league

References

2022 Women's Africa Cup of Nations
Women's Africa Cup of Nation's squads